The 1908–09 Indiana State Sycamores men's basketball team' represented Indiana State University during the 1908–09 college men's basketball season. The head coach was Eddy Conners, coaching the Sycamores in his sole season in Terre Haute. The team played their home games at North Hall in Terre Haute, Indiana.

Schedule

|-

References

Indiana State Sycamores men's basketball seasons
Indiana State
Indiana State
Indiana State